Kyunhla is a town in Kanbalu District, Sagaing Division in north-western  Burma (Myanmar) about 70 kilometres east of Mawlaik. It is the administrative center of Kyunhla Township.

External links
"Kyunhla Map — Satellite Images of Modaung" Maplandia.com

Populated places in Sagaing Region
Township capitals of Myanmar